George Renwick may refer to:

 Sir George Renwick, 1st Baronet (1850–1931), English politician and shipowner
 George Renwick (athlete) (1901–1984), British athlete who competed mainly in the 400 metres
 George Renwick (American politician) (1789–1831), American politician
 George Renwick (footballer) (1886–1945), Australian rules footballer